Martina Navratilova was the defending champion of the singles title at the Virginia Slims of Washington tennis tournament but did not compete that year.

Graf won in the final 6–1, 7–5 against Zina Garrison.

Seeds
A champion seed is indicated in bold text while text in italics indicates the round in which that seed was eliminated.

  Steffi Graf (champion)
 n/a
  Manuela Maleeva (quarterfinals)
  Natasha Zvereva (semifinals)
  Zina Garrison (final)
  Barbara Potter (first round)
  Larisa Savchenko (first round)
  Helen Kelesi (quarterfinals)

Draw

References
 1989 Virginia Slims of Washington Draw

Virginia Slims of Washington
1989 WTA Tour